Hewoto was a politician from Nagaland, India. In 2003 he was elected to the Nagaland Legislative Assembly, as the Naga People's Front candidate in the constituency Dimapur-II (ST).

References

Nagaland MLAs 2003–2008
Naga People's Front politicians
Living people
Year of birth missing (living people)